The Tokyo Seikatsusha Network (東京・生活者ネットワーク, Tōkyō Seikatsusha Nettowāku) is a local Japanese political party affiliated with Tokyo Seikatsu Club, a consumer's cooperative. It is generally moderate left, and tends to appeal to the same voters as the Social Democratic Party of Japan and Constitutional Democratic Party of Japan.

See also 
 Liberalism in Japan

References

External links
  

Consumer organizations in Japan
Regional parties in Japan
Politics of Tokyo
Political parties established in 1977
1977 establishments in Japan